The Old Castlemaine Gaol is a prison located in Castlemaine, Victoria, Australia. The prison was modelled on Pentonville; the present building replaced the original, designed by Inspector General John Price which was never occupied. Built in 1861 to house offenders from the goldfields and nearby towns, it served various functions in the penal system before it was closed down and its prisoners transferred to HM Prison Loddon in 1990.

From 1861 to 1908 (the colonial era), the gaol housed all manner of criminals, including lunatics, debtors and ten men that were hanged within the walls. In the later of these years however, the gaol housed mostly short term sentenced prisoners and first time offenders.

Between 1909 and 1951, the gaol was transformed into a reformatory school for boys aged between 16 and 25 (but most were under 21).

The gaol then closed for a number of years, before reopening in 1954 to accommodate medium security prisoners from across the state once again. It remained open until August 1990.

After it ceased prison operations, it was used as a hotel and tourist attraction. It served as the studio for local community radio station WMA FM/Main FM 94.9 as well as various small businesses.

In 2018 the old gaol was sold to artist David Bromley (artist).

The grounds were originally landscaped by renowned landscape gardener Hugh Linaker.

Notable prisoners
Peter Dupasserving a life sentence for multiple murder and rape.
 Greece Illusionist Alexander Canaris, serving three months for larceny in 1889–1890.

Executions

Notable wardens
Thomas Francis Hyland, later a very successful wine industry businessman of Penfolds fame, was from around 1868 to 1875 the notoriously hard-driving governor of the gaol. Under his tutelage prisoners were obliged to work or do without rations. Within a few years not only the gaol, but the town of Castlemaine had been transformed by their efforts and his organisational skills.

References

Clark, Mary Rillis (1995). "Castlemaine's magic gaol on the hill." The Age. 13 May.
Mitchell, Glenn (2003). "A Night in Irons." Herald Sun (Melbourne). 4 January.
Wilkinson, Geoff (2005). "Rapist looked after my daughter." Herald Sun (Melbourne). 6 December.

Defunct prisons in Victoria (Australia)
1990 disestablishments in Australia
1857 establishments in Australia